is a Japanese manga series written and illustrated by Kenshi Hirokane. It depicts the growth and career of a fictional salaryman named Kōsaku Shima. It has been serialized in Kodansha's Morning, starting with the first series Kachō Shima Kōsaku in 1983 and has currently been divided into eight parts. The current part, Shagai Torishimariyaku Shima Kōsaku, began in 2022.

The manga has also been published as 7 bilingual volumes (Japanese-English) called Division Chief Kosaku Shima and President Kosaku Shima, and in French and German. In addition to various manga there has also been one comedic ONA, and two comedic anime adaptations lasting 11 episodes each, a live action film, and a single episode TV drama. The character also acts as the "host" or framing device for a business documentary series on NHK World, Shima Kosaku's Asian Entrepreneurs.

As of February 2022, the series had over 47 million copies in circulation, making it one of the best-selling manga series. In 1991, the manga won the 15th Kodansha Manga Award in the General category.

Summary
At the start of the long-running series, Shima Kōsaku is a kachō, or section chief, of a huge conglomerate, Hatsushiba Electric. He is later promoted to buchō (division chief) and eventually promoted to manager and executive-director, and with each promotion the title of the series changed as well. He was promoted to the president of Hatsushiba Electric, and the title changed to "Shachō" Shima Kōsaku, which means "President Kōsaku Shima". The fictional conglomerate is modeled after Panasonic, or Matsushita Electric, where Hirokane worked before and is highly accurate in its portrayal of Japanese corporate culture.

Series
, 1983–1992: 17 volumes
, 1992–2002: 13 volumes
, 2002–2005: 8 volumes
, 2005–2006: 6 volumes
, 2006–2008: 5 volumes
, 2008–2013: 16 volumes
, 2013–2019: 13 volumes
, 2019–2022: 6 volumes
, 2022–present: 1 volume

Spin-offs
, 2001–2006, Evening: 4 volumes
, 2006–2010, Evening: 4 volumes
, 2010–2013, Evening: 4 volumes
, 2014–2017, Evening: 6 volumes
, 2017–2018, Evening: 3 volumes
, 2017 (written by Shin Kibayashi), Morning: 1 volume
, 2019(crossover with That Time I Got Reincarnated as a Slime; co-written by Fuse and Taiki Kawakami; character design: Mittsubā), Evening: 1 volume
, 2019–present (illustrated by Fusuke Miyamoto), Monthly Comic Zero Sum: 1 volume

Video games 
Kachō Kōsaku Shima: Super Business Adventure (Super Famicom) 1993 (published by Yutaka)
CR Kachō Kōsaku Shima (Pachinko) 2006 (published by Newgin)
Kachō Shima Kōsaku DS: Dekiru Otoko no Love & Success (Nintendo DS) 2008 (published by Konami)

Reception
As of February 2022, the series had over 47 million copies in circulation. In 1991, Kachō Shima Kōsaku won the 15th Kodansha Manga Award in the General category. In 2019, the series also received a Special Award at the 43rd Kodansha Manga Award, commemorating 110 years since Kodansha's founding.

References

External links
 A question of character, The Economist, 7 August 2008
 

1992 manga
2001 manga
2002 manga
2005 manga
2006 manga
2008 manga
2010 manga
2013 manga
2014 manga
Business in anime and manga
Kodansha manga
Seinen manga
Winner of Kodansha Manga Award (General)